"Hello Good Morning"' is a song by Dirty Money

Hello Good Morning may also refer to:
Hello Good Morning, TV show Golden Bell Awards: 1990–99 winners list
Hello Good Morning (Nick MacKenzie song)